The Anker was a German automobile manufactured in Berlin between 1919 and 1920.  Cars were built up from war-surplus components of the  inline-four engine Wanderer.

Vintage vehicles
Defunct motor vehicle manufacturers of Germany